Joseph Brys (born 2 July 1927) was a Belgian middle-distance runner. He competed in the men's 800 metres at the 1948 Summer Olympics.

References

External links
 

1927 births
Possibly living people
Athletes (track and field) at the 1948 Summer Olympics
Belgian male middle-distance runners
Olympic athletes of Belgium
Place of birth missing